Helen Macdonald Simpson (21 November 1890 – 6 November 1960) was a notable New Zealand teacher, university lecturer and writer. She was born in Wellington, New Zealand, in 1890. Norman Richmond was her younger brother.

Life
She graduated from Canterbury College, and from the University of London with a PhD. She taught at Christchurch Training College. She was the first New Zealand woman to be awarded a doctorate, and also the first New Zealand woman to teach at a New Zealand university.

On 29 January 1927, she married Arthur Barrows Simpson. She wrote The women of New Zealand, a social history survey, which was published in 1940 as part of a government programme to mark 100 years of colonisation of New Zealand.

References

1890 births
1960 deaths
Academic staff of the University of Canterbury
People from Wellington City
Atkinson–Hursthouse–Richmond family